Jerediah Horsford (March 8, 1791 – January 14, 1875) was an American politician from New York.

Life
Horsford attended the common schools, and then engaged in agricultural pursuits. He served during the War of 1812, took part in the defense of Burlington, Vermont. He later moved to Genesee County, New York, where he served as an officer in a unit which took part in the Battle of Lundy's Lane.

In 1815, he went to Moscow, New York as a missionary to the Seneca Indians. In 1818 he moved to Mount Morris, New York, where he was a farmer. He was a pioneer in scientific farming methods, an active member of several agricultural societies, and the inventor of an animal feed named Horsford's Cattle Food.

He remained in the New York Militia, and rose to colonel and commander of the regiment based in Livingston County.

He was an Anti-Masonic member of the New York State Assembly (Livingston Co.) in 1831.

Horsford was elected as a Whig to the 32nd United States Congress, holding office from March 4, 1851, to March 3, 1853.

He moved to Livonia, New York in 1863. He died in Livonia and was buried at Moscow Cemetery, now in Leicester, New York.

His children included inventor and scientist Eben Norton Horsford.

Sources

1791 births
1875 deaths
Anti-Masonic Party politicians from New York (state)
Members of the New York State Assembly
People from Charlotte, Vermont
People from Leicester, New York
American militiamen in the War of 1812
Whig Party members of the United States House of Representatives from New York (state)
19th-century American politicians
People from Livonia, New York
American militia officers